Trial films is a subgenre of the legal/courtroom drama that encompasses films that are centered on a civil or criminal trial, typically a trial by jury.

The "trial" genre differs from the broader "courtroom drama" in that the latter includes any film in which a justice system plays an integral role in the film's narrative, and thus does not necessarily require the inclusion of a legal trial.

Notable films
In 1989, the American Bar Association rated the 12 best trial films of all time in their ABA Journal, providing a detailed and reasoned legal evaluation for its choices. Ten of the films are in English; M (1931) is in German and The Passion of Joan of Arc (1928) is a French silent film. Moreover, ten of them take place (at least, in part) in a courtroom.

In 2008, the American Film Institute compiled its own "courtroom drama" top-ten list, five films of which were also on the ABA list.

The ABA also published a list of the 12 best trial stageplays, noting that the transition from film to the stage is sometimes difficult. It also has an extensive honorable mention list.

Varieties
Outside of the first few minutes of the film, 12 Angry Men (1957) never enters a courtroom at all. It views the particular case and the system of justice through the prism of jury deliberations. The film explains practical explications of legal concepts basic to the American system of justice, and their effect on a particular trial and defendant. Those include the presumption of innocence, burden of proof, and the requirement of proof beyond a reasonable doubt.

The trial in M (1931) does not take place in a legal courtroom; rather, crime syndicate leaders along with the city's underground hold proceedings in a warehouse. Despite the lack of legal trappings, "it is one of the most effective trials ever filmed, questioning our notions of justice and revenge, mob rule and order, power and responsibility." Wearing long leather coats instead of robes, criminals become judges. The murderer is cast as the victim, while the forces of law and order must rely on luck. Peter Lorre strikingly raises the issue of his culpability due to alleged insanity, and the imposition of ultimate retributive justice is depicted as being unsatisfying for society and the survivors of the murdered victims.

While courtroom films are typically dramas, My Cousin Vinny (1992) is a comedy centered on a trial in Alabama. It resulted in Marisa Tomei winning the Best Supporting Actress Oscar.

Military trial films
The military trial film is a subtype of the trial genre that focuses on military trials (i.e., courts-martial).

They typically include conflicting questions of loyalty, command responsibility, ethical rules and rules of engagement, obedience to superior authority, politics and class conflict. War and trials are good foils for one another. The struggles are perennial and engaging. A partial list includes:

Religious trial films
 God on Trial (2008) is a BBC/WGBH Boston television play that takes place in Auschwitz during World War II. The Jewish prisoners put God on trial in absentia for abandoning the Jewish people by allowing Nazi Germany to commit genocide.
 The Passion of the Christ (2004), in which Jesus Christ (played by Jim Caviezel) is alternately tried by Herod Antipas and Pontius Pilate and ultimately executed by Pilate. Nominated for three Academy Awards.
 The Devil and Daniel Webster (1941) features Walter Huston as the Devil arguing for a man's soul. Huston was nominated for the Best Actor in a Leading Role Academy Award.
Solomon and Sheba (1959) portrays the famous Judgment of Solomon from the Bible.
 The Man Who Sued God (2001), an Australian film starring Billy Connolly who takes God (represented by the church) to court for compensation over the destruction of his fishing boat due to an "act of God".
 Inherit the Wind (1960), starring Spencer Tracy, Fredric March, and Gene Kelly, is an American film set in a small religious town where a teacher begins to teach evolution, and goes to court for his right to teach such.
 The Exorcism of Emily Rose (2005), directed by Scott Derrickson, is an American courtroom drama horror film loosely based on the story of Anneliese Michel. It follows a self-proclaimed agnostic defense lawyer representing a parish priest who is accused by the state of negligent homicide after he performed an exorcism. The film, which largely takes place in a courtroom, depicts the events leading up to and including the exorcism through flashbacks.
 The Crucible (1996) is a drama film written by Arthur Miller and based on his play of the same name, loosely dramatising the Salem witch trials. It was directed by Nicholas Hytner and stars Daniel Day-Lewis as John Proctor, Winona Ryder as Abigail Williams, Paul Scofield as Judge Thomas Danforth, and Joan Allen as Elizabeth Proctor.

Other examples

 An American Tragedy, a 1931 drama directed by Josef von Sternberg.
 Judge Priest, a 1934 Will Rogers comedy directed by John Ford.
 The Prisoner of Shark Island, a 1936 biopic directed by John Ford.
 Fury, a 1936 drama directed by Fritz Lang.
 Mr. Deeds Goes to Town, a 1936 film by Frank Capra.
 They Won't Forget, a 1937 drama film directed by Mervyn LeRoy.
 Young Mr. Lincoln, a 1939 biopic directed by John Ford.
 The Return of Frank James, a 1940 western directed by Fritz Lang.
 The Letter, a 1940 film directed by William Wyler.
 The Devil and Daniel Webster, a 1941 fantasy film directed by William Dieterle.
 Roxie Hart, 1942 comedy directed by William Wellman.
 The Ox-Bow Incident, unusual in that the trial does not take place in a formal court room, but is a vote among a posse that turns into a lynch mob. Directed by William A. Wellman, and starring Henry Fonda (who also starred in Twelve Angry Men). It was nominated for Best Picture Oscar in 1943.
 Leave Her to Heaven, a 1945 film noir directed by John M. Stahl.
 In Miracle on 34th Street (1947) Kris Kringle (Edmund Gwenn) has his sanity examined at a hearing. The film won 4 Academy Awards, with Gwenn winning for Best Actor in a Supporting Role. The film was also nominated for Best Picture.
 The Lady from Shanghai, a 1947 film noir directed and starring Orson Welles.
 The Paradine Case, a 1947 film noir directed by Alfred Hitchcock.
 Pinky, a 1949 film directed by Elia Kazan.
 Adam's Rib, a 1949 comedy directed by George Cukor.
 Rashomon, a 1950 film directed by Akira Kurosawa.
 A Place in the Sun, a 1951 drama film directed by George Stevens.
 The Sun Shines Bright, 1953 remake directed by John Ford.
 The Phenix City Story, a 1955 film noir crime film directed by Phil Karlson.
 Gunman's Walk, a 1958 western directed by Phil Karlson.
 The Wreck of the Mary Deare is told in flashbacks as witnesses give their account of a story during an Admiralty court proceeding.
 Compulsion, a 1959 film directed by Richard Fleischer.
 Sergeant Rutledge, a 1960 western directed by John Ford.
 It Started in Naples, a 1960 film directed by Melville Shavelson.
 La Vérité, a 1960 film directed by Henri-Georges Clouzot.
 Divorce Italian Style, a 1961 comedy-drama film directed by Pietro Germi.
 The Man Who Shot Liberty Valance, a 1962 western directed by John Ford.
 Kibar Feyzo (1978) is a Turkish comedy drama film starring Kemal Sunal, Şener Şen, Müjde Ar, Adile Naşit, İhsan Yüce, İlyas Salman and Erdal Özyağcılar.
 ...And Justice for All (1979), directed by Norman Jewison and nominated for 2 Academy Awards, examines the flawed and human, venal, and immoral side of justice, focusing on all-too-human judges. As Norman Webster wrote, the film "is a sweeping – and somewhat simple-minded – indictment of the American justice system." The film can be seen from the perspective of Judicial Qualifications Commissions (also known as Judicial Tenure Commissions), which are judicial agencies charged with overseeing judicial performance and conduct. From that end, the indictment of the courts and judicial system (and the examples) are not so outlandish as might be supposed. Starred Al Pacino, Jack Warden, and John Forsythe.
 From the Hip (1987) is a Comedy Drama starring Judd Nelson, Elizabeth Perkins, John Hurt, and Ray Walston about a first year lawyer manipulating his way into trying a case much earlier in his career than is normal. Much of the humor took place in the first case, a simple assault case in which he garnered significant media attention and developed a high profile for himself and attention to his firm. The more dramatic second case was a murder case which tested the young attorney's ethics.
Suspect (1987) is a legal mystery thriller starring Cher, Dennis Quaid and Liam Neeson.
The Accused (1988) is a legal drama starring Jodie Foster.  It is loosely based on the 1983 gang rape case of Cheryl Araujo.
 Presumed Innocent (1990) is a film directed by Alan J. Pakula, adapted from the novel of the same name by Scott Turow, in which an assistant district attorney (Harrison Ford) is on trial, framed for the murder of another assistant DA (Greta Scacchi). The film received several nominations for its screenplay, written by Alan J. Pakula and Frank Pierson.
 JFK (1991) is an American conspiracy-thriller film that examines the events leading to the assassination of John F. Kennedy, and it alleged cover-up, through the eyes of former New Orleans district attorney Jim Garrison. The film culminates in the 1969 trial of businessman Clay Shaw for his alleged participation in a conspiracy to assassinate the president.
 The Client a 1994 American legal thriller film directed by Joel Schumacher, and starring Susan Sarandon, Tommy Lee Jones and Brad Renfro in his film debut. It is based on the novel of the same name by John Grisham. The film was released in the United States on July 20, 1994. The movie features an all star cast. Sarandon nominated for an Academy Award for Best Actress and won a BAFTA Award for Best Actress in a Leading Role.
 Primal Fear (1996) is a film, directed by Gregory Hoblit, that tells a story of a defense attorney (Richard Gere) who defends an altar boy (Edward Norton) charged with the murder of a Catholic archbishop. The film is an adaptation of William Diehl's novel of the same name. Norton was nominated for an Academy Award for Best Supporting Actor for his career-launching role.
 A Civil Action (1998) is a film based on the 1996 nonfiction novel of the same name. It stars John Travolta and Robert Duvall, the latter having been nominated for Best Supporting Actor for the film.
 A Time to Kill (1996) is a feature film adaptation of John Grisham's 1989 legal drama of the same name.
 The Rainmaker (1997) is a feature film adaptation of John Grisham's 1995 legal thriller of the same name. It stars Matt Damon, Claire Danes, Jon Voight, Mary Kay Place, Mickey Rourke, Danny DeVito, Danny Glover, Roy Scheider, Virginia Madsen, and Teresa Wright in her final film role.
 Amistad (1997) is a historical drama, directed by Steven Spielberg, based on the true story of an uprising in 1839 by newly-captured African slaves that took place aboard the ship La Amistad off the coast of Cuba, the subsequent voyage to the northeastern United States, and the legal battle that followed their capture by a U.S. revenue cutter. It was nominated for four Academy Awards.
 Chicago (2002) is a remake directed by Rob Marshall.
 Bernie (2011) is a black comedy film based on the real-life 1996 murder of 81-year-old millionaire Marjorie Nugent in Carthage, Texas by her companion Bernhardt "Bernie" Tiede. Tiede having been extremely well-liked in his local community, the film explores the trial process and the popular support he received, which caused great difficulties for the prosecution.
 The Trial (2014) is a Filipino legal drama film that tells the story of a mentally handicapped man who is accused of rape by the family of a teacher on whom he has a crush. It stars John Lloyd Cruz, Jessy Mendiola, Gretchen Barretto, Richard Gomez and Enrique Gil, and was produced by Star Cinema as part of their 20th anniversary offering.
The Trial of the Chicago 7 (2020) is a legal drama focused on the trial of the so-called 'Chicago Seven' in the late 1960s to early 1970.

See also
Legal drama
List of trial films

References

Further reading
 
  ; ; .
 

  
Sarat, Austin, Jessica Silbey, and Martha Merrill Umphrey, eds. (2019). Trial Films on Trial: Law, Justice, and Popular Culture. University of Alabama Press. .
 (includes a section on movies about lawyers)

External links
 807 "Best trial movies" at Internet Movie Database, which brings a worldwide perspective, but also lumps in some movies that do not quickly come to mind as "trial movies".
 
 
 

Drama
Film genres
Legal films by genre
 Trial movies